Concept mapping and mind mapping software is used to create diagrams of relationships between concepts, ideas, or other pieces of information. It has been suggested that the mind mapping technique can improve learning and study efficiency up to 15% over conventional note-taking. Many software packages and websites allow creating or otherwise supporting mind maps.

File format

Using a standard file format allows interchange of files between various programs. Many programs listed below support the OPML file format and the XML file format used by FreeMind.

Free and open-source
The following tools comply with the Free Software Foundation's (FSF) definition of free software. As such, they are also open-source software.

Freeware
The following is a list of notable concept mapping and mind mapping applications which are freeware and available at no cost. Some are open source and others are proprietary software.

Proprietary software
The table below lists pieces of proprietary commercial software that allow creating mind and concept maps.

See also

 Brainstorming
 
 List of Unified Modeling Language tools
 Outliner
 Study software

References

Concept mapping
 
 

mn:Санааг зураглагч програмнууд
simple:Diagramming software
sv:Diagramprogram